The Diablo Range is a mountain range in the California Coast Ranges subdivision of the Pacific Coast Ranges in northern California, United States. It stretches from the eastern San Francisco Bay area at its northern end to the Salinas Valley area at its southern end.

Geography 

The Diablo Range extends from the Carquinez Strait in the north to Orchard Peak and Polonio Pass in the south, near the point where State Route 46 crosses over the Coast Ranges at Cholame, as described by the United States Geological Survey (USGS). It is bordered on the northeast by the San Joaquin River, on the southeast by the San Joaquin Valley, on the southwest by the Salinas River, and on the northwest by the Santa Clara Valley. The USGS designation is somewhat ambiguous north of the Santa Clara Valley, but on USGS maps, the range is shown as the ridgeline which runs between its namesake Mount Diablo southeastward past Mount Hamilton. Geologically, the range corresponds to the California Coast Ranges east of the Calaveras Fault in this northern section. For much of its length, it is paralleled by other sections of the California Coast Ranges to the west, the Santa Cruz Mountains across the southern San Francisco Bay and Santa Clara Valley, and the Santa Lucia Range across the Salinas Valley.

The range passes through Contra Costa, Alameda, San Joaquin, Santa Clara, Stanislaus, Merced, San Benito, Fresno, Monterey, and Kings Counties, and ends in the northwesternmost extremity of Kern County.

Topography 

Peaks often have high topographic prominence, as they are surrounded by valleys or lower hills or plateaus. Streams draining the eastern slopes of the Diablo Range include Hospital Creek and Ingram Creek. Stream draining the western slopes include Alameda Creek and Coyote Creek.

Peaks 

Mount Diablo, San Benito Mountain, Mount Hamilton Ridge, and Mount Stakes are four of the highest peaks in the range.

Human elements 

The Diablo Range is paralleled for much of its distance by U.S. Route 101 to the west and by I-5 to the east.
Major routes of travel through the range include:
 North of the range
 BNSF Railway/Amtrak San Joaquin
 Willow Pass 
 State Route 4
 BART 
 Altamont Pass
 Union Pacific Railroad/Altamont Corridor Express
 I-580
 Sunol Valley
 State Route 84
 I-680
 Patterson Pass 
 Corral Hollow Pass
 Mount Hamilton
 State Route 130
 Pacheco Pass
 State Route 152
 Future California High-Speed Rail
 Panoche Pass
 State Route 198
 Cottonwood Pass (State Route 41)
 Polonio Pass (State Route 46)

A sparsely used gravel road is the highest road in the range, with its highest point being on San Benito Mountain at over 5,000 feet.

The Diablo Range is largely unpopulated outside of the San Francisco Bay Area. Major nearby communities include, Antioch, Pittsburg, Concord, Walnut Creek, Alamo, Danville, San Ramon, Pleasanton, Livermore, Fremont, Milpitas, San Jose, Morgan Hill, and Gilroy and the Central Valley city of Tracy. South of Pacheco Pass, the only major nearby communities (those with a population over 15,000) are Los Banos, and Hollister. The small town of Coalinga may also be notable for its location on State Route 198, one of the few routes through the mountains. Also the town of Kettleman City is also on State Route 41, another route that crosses the mountains. Towns west of the range south of Gilroy include: Salinas, King City, and Paso Robles.

Protected areas 

Most of the range consists of private ranchland, limiting recreational use. However, the range does contain several areas of parkland, including Mount Diablo State Park, Alum Rock Park, Grant Ranch Park, Henry W. Coe State Park, Laguna Mountain Recreation Area, and the BLM's Clear Creek Management Area. In addition, some private land is held in conservation easements by the California Rangeland Trust.

Natural history 

Winters are mild with moderate rainfall, but summers are very dry and hot. Areas above 2,500 feet (762 m) get light to moderate snow in the winter, especially at the highest point, the 5,241 ft (1,597 m) San Benito Mountain in the remote southeastern section of the range. However, though sites at the lower end get annual snowfall, it is typically light and melts too fast to be noticed. Once or twice a decade there is seriously deep and long lasting snowfall.

Mercury contamination near the southern end of the range is an ongoing problem, due to the New Idria quicksilver mines, which stopped production in the 1970s. Heavy mercury contamination has been documented in the San Carlos and Silver Creeks, which flow into Panoche Creek, and thence into the San Joaquin River. This has resulted in mercury contamination all the way downstream to the San Francisco Bay. Silver and San Carlos creeks provide a wetland environment in an otherwise arid region and are important for the ecology of the region. As of 2011, New Idria has been listed as a Superfund site and scheduled for cleanup.

Flora 

The Diablo Range is part of the California interior chaparral and woodlands ecoregion. It is covered mostly by chaparral and California oak woodland communities, with stands of closed-cone pine forests appearing above 4,000 feet (1,219 m). The native bunch grass savanna has been predominantly replaced by annual Mediterranean grasses, except in some rare habitat fragments. The understory is dominated with nonnative invasives. Blooming in spring are such plants as Viola pedunculata, Dodecatheon pulchellum, Fritillaria liliacea, and Ribes malvaceum, which can be viewed in the Blue Oak Ranch Reserve.

The range's riparian zones have such trees as bigleaf maple (Acer macrophyllum), white alder (Alnus rhombifolia), California bay (Umbellularia californica), and California sycamore (Platanus racemosa).

The most common trees are coast live oak (Quercus agrifolia) and blue oak (Quercus douglasii), with the largest blue oak growing in Alameda County. There are also good populations of California buckeye (Aesculus californica), and California black oak (Quercus kelloggii). Coulter pine reaches its northern limit on northern of Mt. Diablo. The conifers at higher elevations in the Diablo Range include knobcone pine (Pinus attenuata), Jeffrey pine (Pinus jeffreyi) and ponderosa pine (Pinus ponderosa).

Fauna 

The Diablo Range attracts far more raptors than coastal forests, such as red-tailed hawks. Golden eagle nesting sites are found in the Diablo Range, reaching their highest density in southern Alameda County.

The Bay checkerspot butterfly, a federally listed threatened species, has habitat in the Range, especially at Mount Diablo. The California tiger salamander (Ambystoma californiense), also a federally threatened species and a vulnerable species of amphibian native to Northern California, lives in ponds in the range. The northern Pacific rattlesnake is thriving, as are many ground squirrels, hares, and various species of native and nonnative rodents.

Tule elk (Cervus canadensis ssp. nannodes) were restored to Mount Hamilton between 1978-1981 and are slowly recovering in several small herds in Santa Clara and Alameda Counties. See Mount Hamilton elk recovery. Black-tailed deer are abundant. Pronghorn, grizzly bears, and wolves were extirpated in the 1800s. There still are numerous coyotes and some of the more vital mountain lion populations in the state. There are excellent populations of bobcats and gray foxes, which depend on the chaparral habitat.

A species of millipede, Illacme plenipes, is endemic to the southern Diablo Range. First described in 1926, then not seen again until 2005, the species has more legs than any other species of millipede, with one specimen having 750.

See also 

 Mountain ranges of the San Francisco Bay Area
 Rancho Cañada de Pala
 Rancho Santa Teresa

References

 
California Coast Ranges
Mountain ranges of Northern California
Mountain ranges of the San Francisco Bay Area
Mountain ranges of Contra Costa County, California
Mountain ranges of Alameda County, California
Mountain ranges of Santa Clara County, California
Mountain ranges of San Joaquin County, California
Mountain ranges of Stanislaus County, California
Mountain ranges of Merced County, California
Mountain ranges of San Benito County, California
Mountain ranges of Fresno County, California
Mountain ranges of Monterey County, California
Mountain ranges of Kings County, California
Mountain ranges of Kern County, California
Geography of the San Joaquin Valley
Subregions of the San Francisco Bay Area
Mountain ranges of Southern California